Nicholas Emiliou (born Famagusta, Cyprus, 14 June 1963) is a Cypriot diplomat and jurist.  Since 2017, he is Ambassador Extraordinary and Plenipotentiary and Permanent Representative of Cyprus to the European Union, based at the Permanent Representation of Cyprus to the EU in Brussels. On 21 April 2021, he was appointed to become Advocate General of the European Court of Justice.

Education and University Career
He received an LL.M. (European Law) from the London School of Economics and Political Science in 1987 and a Ph.D. (Law) from University College London in 1991. He held various academic jobs in the UK from 1988 to 1997, at University College London, the University of Southampton, Queen Mary University of London and the University of Durham.  During this time as a Fellow of the UCL Centre for European Law, he worked closely with  his European law colleagues, the great Professor Valentine Korah, pioneer of antitrust law in the UK and one of the greatest competition lawyers in the world, Sir Basil Markesinis, David O'Keeffe and Margot Horspool.  He also published many books and articles.

Diplomatic career
Ambassador Emiliou joined the Ministry of Foreign Affairs of Cyprus in 1997 and was first appointed as Minister Plenipotentiary at the EU Division of the Ministry of Foreign Affairs in Nicosia.  In 1998, he became Deputy Permanent Delegate of Cyprus to the European Union, and in 1999, became Ambassador Plenipotentiary and Extraordinary of the Republic of Cyprus in Ireland. In 2000 he was Promoted to the rank of the Ambassador of Cyprus. From 2002 to 2004, he was Permanent Representative of Cyprus to the Council of Europe, Strasbourg.  From 2004 to 2008, he was Permanent Representative of Cyprus to the European Union and from 2008 to 2012, he was Permanent Secretary, that is, the senior permanent official of the Ministry of Foreign Affairs. In 2012, he was appointed Permanent Representative of Cyprus to the United Nations, which he left in 2017 to return to Brussels as Permanent Representative of Cyprus to the European Union.

Appointment as Advocate General

On 21 April 2021, he was appointed by the representatives of the Governments of the EU Member States to become Advocate General of the European Court of Justice from 7 October 2021 to 6 October 2027.

Notes

External links 
  Ministry of Foreign Affairs Cyprus

Living people
Cypriot diplomats
People from Famagusta
Alumni of the London School of Economics
Alumni of University College London
Academics of Durham University
Academics of the University of London
Academics of University College London
People associated with University College London
1963 births